The 1974 New Zealand bravery awards were announced via a Special Honours List dated 29 March 1974, and recognised one person for an act of bravery the previous year.

Order of the British Empire

Member (MBE)
Civil division, for gallantry
 Joseph Dennis Farrow – inspector, New Zealand Police.

References

Bravery
Bravery awards
New Zealand bravery awards